Sol Bloom (March 9, 1870March 7, 1949) was an American song-writer and politician from New York City who began his career as an entertainment impresario and sheet music publisher in Chicago. He served fourteen terms in the United States House of Representatives from the West Side of Manhattan, from 1923 until his death in 1949.

Bloom was the chairman of the House Foreign Affairs Committee from 1939 to 1947 and again in 1949, during a critical period of American foreign policy.  In the run-up to World War II, he took charge of high-priority foreign-policy legislation for the Roosevelt Administration, including authorization for Lend Lease in 1940.  He oversaw Congressional approval of the United Nations and of the United Nations Relief and Rehabilitation Administration (UNRRA) which worked to assist millions of displaced people in Europe.  He was a member of the American delegation at the creation of the United Nations in San Francisco in 1945 and at the Rio Conference of 1947.

Bloom was especially concerned with the fate of European Jews but was unable to overcome very strong resistance to admitting Jews or any refugees before the war.  He argued vigorously after the war that the United States needed to take in larger numbers of refugees.  He adopted the Zionist position that mandated Palestine should become the refuge for Jewish victims of the Holocaust.  He urgently lobbied President Harry Truman in 1948 to immediately recognize the Jewish state of Israel, which Truman did.  When the Republicans took control of the Foreign Affairs Committee after the 1946 election, Bloom worked closely with the new chairman, Charles Eaton.  They secured approval for the Truman Doctrine and the Marshall Plan.

Early life
Bloom was born March 9, 1870, in Pekin, Illinois, to Polish-Jewish immigrants who soon moved to San Francisco.  He was introduced to theater production in his early teens, then became a theater manager, staging boxing matches featuring "Gentleman Jim" Corbett. Seeking ever more spectacular attractions, he attended the Exposition Universelle (1889) in Paris, where he was particularly taken with the dancers and acrobats of the "Algerian Village," somewhat representative of France's Algerian colony.

Chicago World's Fair
Bloom established his reputation in 1893 at the age of 23 while developing the mile-long Midway Plaisance at the World's Columbian Exposition in Chicago. The Midway Plaisance offered enticing games and exhibitions presented by private vendors, removed from the more conservative Beaux-Arts splendor of the official exposition and arranged around its "Court of Honor". After initially entrusting the midway to a Harvard anthropology professor, the committee turned to Bloom, whose "Midway" was so successful that the term resided henceforth in the American lexicon. At the "Street in Cairo", the North African belly dance was reinvented as the "hootchy-kootchy dance" to a tune made up by Bloom, "The Streets of Cairo, or the Poor Little Country Maid", whose century-old lyrics had traditionally been sung by young boys: "O they don't wear pants/on the sunny side of France"; "There's a place in France/where the women wear no pants"; "...where the naked ladies dance", etc. Bloom did not copyright the tune, which he'd conceived on a piano at the Press Club of Chicago. Bloom also published and promoted “Coon, Coon, Coon”, one of the most famous entries in the coon song genre.

Bloom's role in helping to develop the fair had been at the behest of Mayor Carter Harrison, Sr., who was assassinated only days before the exposition closed. Bloom then rose in stature in Chicago's tough First Ward among the Democratic party's bosses "Bathhouse" John Coughlin and "Hinky Dink" Kenna. Soon, he became Chicago branch manager of M. Witmark & Sons, the largest publisher of sheet music in the United States, and by 1896 he was publishing under his own name and introducing photolithographs to make the scores more visually appealing. In 1897 he married Evelyn Hechheimer and settled in a fashionable district on South Prairie Avenue, billing himself as "Sol Bloom, the Music Man". At the turn of the 20th century, he was awarded, to much fanfare, the first musical copyright of the new century for "I Wish I Was in Dixie Land Tonight" by Raymond A. Browne.

Move to New York and politics

In 1903 he moved to New York City, where he dabbled in real estate and expanded his national chain of department store music departments. In New York, he sold Victor Talking Machines. Bloom soon switched his political affiliation from Republican to the Democrats' Tammany Hall, so that when Representative-elect Samuel Marx of New York's 19th Congressional District died in 1922, Bloom was invited to run and won the usually Republican "silk stocking district" of Manhattan's Upper East Side by 145 votes. He represented the district until his death in 1949.

A confidential 1943 analysis of the House Foreign Affairs Committee by Isaiah Berlin for the British Foreign Office stated that

In Congress Bloom oversaw celebration of the George Washington Bicentennial (1932) and presided over the U.S. Constitution Sesquicentennial Exposition (1937). He chaired the House Committee on Foreign Affairs beginning in 1939. A strong supporter of Zionism, Bloom was a delegate to the convention in San Francisco that established the United Nations.  The first words of the Preamble to the United Nations Charter, "We, the Peoples of the United Nations .. ."  were suggested by Bloom.

In January 1946, Bloom represented the US at the first meeting of the UN General Assembly in London. He called his success in persuading a majority of the Assembly to allow the new United Nations organization to assume the finances of the earlier United Nations Relief and Rehabilitation Administration "the supreme moment" of his life.

Legacy

The Sol Bloom Playground in Manhattan is named in his honor.

His papers, most of them dating from 1935 to 1949, are stored at the New York Public Library.

Bloom lost a bet with Washington Senators pitcher Walter Johnson after Johnson successfully threw a silver dollar across Fredericksburg, Virginia's Rappahannock River. Although the wager had been highly publicized, Bloom cited technicalities and refused to pay.

In 1937, Bloom spearheaded the writing and publication of The Story of the Constitution by the United States Constitution Sesquicentennial Commission.

His wife Evelyn (died 1941) was a composer and singer, and their daughter Vera was an author and lyricist who provided words to the tango "Jalousie".

See also
 List of Jewish members of the United States Congress
 List of United States Congress members who died in office (1900–49)

Notes

Further reading

 Schoenebaum, Eleonora W. ed. Political Profiles: The Truman Years (1978) pp 40–41

Primary sources
Sol Bloom, The Autobiography of Sol Bloom, New York: Putnam House, 1948.
Walter Roth, "Chicago Jewish History: Sol Bloom, the Music Man", 2000 (pdf file)
Biographical sketch of Bloom, focusing on politics and the UN

1870 births
1949 deaths
Jewish members of the United States House of Representatives
American people of Polish-Jewish descent
American Zionists
People from Pekin, Illinois
Writers from Illinois
Writers from New York City
Democratic Party members of the United States House of Representatives from New York (state)
American Orthodox Jews
American officials of the United Nations
Sheet music publishers (people)